Nicolae "Nicu" Popescu (born 25 April 1981) is a Moldovan author and diplomat serving as Minister of Foreign Affairs and European Integration of Moldova in the Sandu Cabinet from June to November 2019. Until and after his appointment, he was the Director of the Wider Europe programme of the European Council on Foreign Relations and visiting professor at Sciences Po-Paris, France's top political science university.

Biography
He graduated from the Moscow State Institute of International Relations in 2002, and continued his studies at the Central European University, where he obtained both an MA and a PhD degree in International Relations.From 2005 to 2007, he was a researcher at the Centre for European Policy Studies (CEPS) in Brussels, Belgium. For two terms between 2007 and 2009 and 2011–2012, he was head of program and senior researcher at the European Council on Foreign Relations (ECFR) office in London. In 2010 and 2012–2013, he was foreign policy advisor to the Prime Minister of Moldova (then Vlad Filat). In that post he dealt, among other things, with the EU-Moldova visa-liberalization process and Moldova's accession to the European Common Aviation Area. Between 2013 and 2018, he worked as a senior analyst at the European Union Institute for Security Studies, the EU's official foreign policy think tank.

He is currently married and has two children. Besides his native Romanian language, he is fluent in English, Russian and French. 

He has published three books and over 60 academic or policy publications. His articles appeared in the Financial Times, New York Times, the Guardian, Foreign Policy, Le Monde, Le Soir, and Euractiv, and he had a blog on the EUobserver. 

In the early weeks of his term, he called for the accession of Moldova to the European Union. Among his key priorities were: the creation of joint infrastructure projects with Romania and the rest of the EU. He sought to accelerate the building of a new gas pipeline connecting Moldova to Romania, the abolition of roaming costs with Romania and the rest of the EU, and the building of new bridges to Romania. He has also called for the normalization of Moldova's relations with Russia.

Bibliography
Books:
EU Foreign Policy and Post-Soviet Conflicts: Stealth Intervention (Routledge, 2010)
Democratization in EU Foreign Policy: New Member States as Drivers of Democracy Promotion, co-editor with Benedetta Berti and Kristina Mikulova, Routledge, 2015.

Selected Policy Papers 
Hacks, Leaks and Disruption – Russian Cyber Strategies, EUISS Chaillot Paper 148, Paris 2018. 
Russia's Return to the Middle East: Building Sandcastles? co-editor, EUISS Chaillot Paper, Paris, 2018.
Third Powers in Europe's East, co-editor, EUISS Chaillot Paper, Paris, 2018.
China and Russia: an Eastern Partnership in the making?; co-author, EUISS Chaillot Paper 140, Paris, December 2016.
The EU neighbours in 1995–2015: shades of grey, cu-authored with Florence Gaub, EUISS Chaillot Paper, December 2015.
Eurasian Union: the real, the imaginary and the likely, Chaillot Paper 132, September 2014, EUISS.
Dealing with a post-BRIC Russia, ECFR Policy report, November 2011, co-authored with Ben Judah and Jana Kobzova.   
The Limits of Enlargement-lite: European and Russian Power in the Troubled Neighbourhood’, ECFR Policy Report, June 2009. 
A Power Audit of EU-Russia Relations’, co-authored with Mark Leonard, Policy Paper 1, European Council on Foreign Relations, November 2007.
EU and the Eastern Neighbourhood: Reluctant Involvement in Conflict Resolution’, European Foreign Affairs Review 14:4, pp. 457–477, 2009.    
Re-setting the Eastern Partnership in Moldova, Policy Brief 199, Centre for European Policy Studies, November 2009, Brussels. 
European and Russian Neighbourhood Policies Compared, cu-authored with Andrew Wilson in Journal of Southeast European and Black Sea Studies, 9:3, 2009, pp. 317 – 331. Can the EU win the peace in Georgia?’, ECFR Policy Brief, 24 August 2008, Nicu Popescu, Mark Leonard and Andrew Wilson.Internationalizing the Georgia-Abkhazia Conflict Resolution Process: Why a Greater European Role is Needed’, GMF Policy Brief; Ron Asmus, Svante E. Cornell, Antje Herrberg, and Nicu Popescu, June 2008.

References

Living people
Moldovan diplomats
Moldovan male writers
Foreign ministers of Moldova
1981 births
Politicians from Chișinău